The Rugby Union of Serbia is the governing body for rugby union in Serbia. It was founded in 1954 and joined Rugby Europe (formerly FIRA-AER) in 1964. It has been a member of World Rugby (formerly the IRB) since 1988.

Leadership

Rugby Union of Serbia

 President of the Alliance: Danilo Bulatovic
 President of the Assembly: Goran Vuković
 General Secretary: Mr Stevan Ilijasevic
 Technical Director: Marko Jovanović
 Competition and Registration Commissioner: Ana Vidojevic

Managing Board
 President: Danilo Bulatović, Belgrade
 Vice President: Igor Stojadinović, Pančevo 
 General Secretary: Stevan Ilijašević, Belgrade 
 Member: Goran Porobić, Novi Sad 
 Member: Mario Kržić, Ruma

Supervisory Board
 President: Goran Višnjić
 Member: Miro Arsenijević 
 Member: Miomir Kalabić

Competition Commission
 President: Goran Višnjić 
 Member: Branislav Vila 
 Member: Viktor Džanković 

Other League Officials
 Disciplinary Judge: Dipl. Right. Sonja Inđić
 President of the Judicial Organization: Dejan Štiglić
 Chairman of the Delegation: Goran Vuković
 President of the Organization of Health Workers in Rugby: Dr Srđan Nikolić

National Team of Serbia
 Director: Marko Milosavljevic 
 Manager: Slavisa Milenkovic 
 Selector: Nikola Orlandic 
 Coach: Aleksandar Poprecica 
 Coach: Marko Milosavljevic

Teams
Serbia - the national men's rugby union team.
7s - the national men's rugby union seven-a-side team.
Serbia - the national women's rugby union team.
7s - the national women's rugby union seven-a-side team.

See also
Rugby union in Serbia
Serbia national rugby union team

References

External links
  Rugby Union of Serbia - Official Site

Rugby union in Serbia
Serbia
Rugby Union
Sports organizations established in 1954